Judit Bognár (28 January 1939 – 26 November 2011) was a Hungarian athlete. She competed in the women's shot put at the 1964, 1968 and the 1972 Summer Olympics.

References

1939 births
2011 deaths
Athletes (track and field) at the 1964 Summer Olympics
Athletes (track and field) at the 1968 Summer Olympics
Athletes (track and field) at the 1972 Summer Olympics
Hungarian female shot putters
Olympic athletes of Hungary
Place of birth missing
Universiade silver medalists for Hungary
Universiade bronze medalists for Hungary
Universiade medalists in athletics (track and field)
Medalists at the 1963 Summer Universiade
Medalists at the 1965 Summer Universiade